Queen's Own is a term meaning that the "crown" (currently the queen) personally sponsored/created something.  It may refer to:

Military Groups
Queen's Own Buffs, The Royal Kent Regiment
Queen's Own Cameron Highlanders
Queen's Own Highlanders (Seaforth and Camerons)
The Queen's Own Rifles of Canada
Queen's Own Royal West Kent Regiment
Queen's Own Yeomanry
Queen's Royal Hussars, see also Queen's Own Hussars
Each division of the Royal Gurkha Rifles

Other
 The Queen's Own Hussars Museum